Ballinard is a civil parish and townland located in the eastern part of County Limerick, Ireland. The civil parish is part of the barony of Smallcounty. The largest population centre is the village of Herbertstown. The south-eastern part of the parish borders the parish of Kilcullane. Geologically, the parish rests on a substratum of limestone, except in some few places where the basalt rises.

History
According to Lewis' Topography of Ireland (1837), the parish contained 867 inhabitants and comprised 1366 statute acres. The land was recorded as "in general good". The rectory was impropriate in Edward Deane Freeman. The tithes of the parish amounted to £148, 18 shillings, of which two-thirds were payable to the impropriatorIn ecclesiastical law, appropriation is the perpetual annexation of an ecclesiastical benefice to the use of some spiritual corporation, either aggregate or sole. In the Middle Ages in England the custom grew up of the monasteries reserving to their own use the greater part of the tithes of their appropriated benefices, leaving only a small portion to their vicars in the parishes. On the dissolution of the monasteries the rights to collect "great tithes" were often sold off, along with former monastic lands, to laymen; whose successors, known as "lay impropriators" or "lay rectors," still hold them, the system being known as impropriation. and the remainder to the vicar. Lewis recorded that there were two pay schools in the parish. The remains of "Ballynard Castle" were to be found on the hill by Ballinard townland itself. This castle was the main seat of a branch of the FitzGerald dynasty that was built in the fifteenth century. The Powel family, who gave their name to a neighbouring townland, had a mansion at Eaglestown.

Ecclesiastical parish
Like all civil parishes, this civil parish is derived from, and co-extensive with a pre-existing Church of Ireland parish of the same name in the diocese of Cashel and Emly. The church mentioned in Lewis's survey is located in the townland of Ballinard. At that time, the church was in ruins.

In the Catholic Church, the civil parish forms part of the ecclesiastical parish of "Herbertstown and Hospital" located at the western edge of the Roman Catholic Archdiocese of Cashel and Emly. There are two church buildings in the parish: the Sacred Heart Church, Herbertstown;National Inventory of Architectural Heritage - Sacred Heart Roman Catholic Church, BALLINARD, Register number 21903224 St. John The Baptist, Hospital.

Townlands

There are four townlands in the parish:
 Ballinard which constitutes 505 acres and contains the ruins of Ballinard Castle, the ruins of the Medieval parish church and the eastern side of the village of Herbertstown.
 Ballyloundash which constitutes 316 acres 
 Cloghaviller which constitutes 545 acres and contains the ruins of Cloghaviller House
 Rootiagh which constitutes 274 acres.

References
From 

Other:

Civil parishes of County Limerick